The Windmill (stylized as WindMill) is a chain of restaurants located mostly near the Jersey Shore known for its hot dogs and other fast food. The original location, a windmill-shaped building in Long Branch, New Jersey, was built and opened in 1963. Leo and Ed Levine bought the restaurant in 1976, and opened a second location in Belmar, New Jersey, three years later. George James in The New York Times writes, "Aside from Sabrett, the family-owned hot dog manufacturer based in New Jersey that makes the Windmill hot dog, the Levines, probably constitute the largest wiener dynasty in the state."  The Windmill's hotdog style is a Jersey Shore flat-grilled dog.

The Windmill's Long Branch location is known for its fierce competition with nearby Max's Famous Hotdogs.

References

External links
  The Windmill Official Website
  Pictorial blog road trip of Monmouth County and the Windmill
  Serious Eats Guide To Regional American Hotdogs

1963 establishments in New Jersey
Companies based in Monmouth County, New Jersey
Hot dog restaurants in the United States
Jews and Judaism in New Jersey
Kosher style restaurants
Long Branch, New Jersey
Restaurants established in 1963
Restaurants in New Jersey
Tourist attractions in Monmouth County, New Jersey